Clissold is a ward in the London Borough of Hackney. The name is derived from Clissold Crescent and the ward also borders Clissold Park in the neighbouring Lordship ward both of which form part of the Hackney North and Stoke Newington constituency. The ward has existed since the creation of the borough on 1 April 1965 and was first used in the 1964 elections. The boundaries of the ward from May 2014 are revised and will take in Clissold Park. Clissold has the highest percentage of residents cycling to work of all wards in London.

At the 2011 Census this ward had a population of 12,212.

1965–1978
Clissold ward has existed since the creation of the London Borough of Hackney on 1 April 1965. It was first used in the 1964 elections, with an electorate of 9,029, returning three councillors.

1978–2002
There was a revision of ward boundaries in Hackney in 1978.

2002–2014
There was a revision of ward boundaries in Hackney in 2002. The ward returns three councillors to Hackney London Borough Council, with elections every four years. At the previous election on 6 May 2010 Karen Alcock, Wendy Mitchell, and Linda Smith; all Labour Party candidates were elected. Turnout was 65%; and 5,600 votes were cast.

In 2001, Clissold ward had a total population of 10,433. This compares with the average ward population within the borough of 10,674.

References

External links 
 London Borough of Hackney list of constituencies and councillors.
 Labour Party profile of Karen Alcock.
 Labour Party profile of Linda Smith.

Wards of the London Borough of Hackney
1965 establishments in England